Zachari Bankolé (born 12 August 1957), known as Isaach or Isaac de Bankolé, is an Ivorian-French-American actor. He is known for his roles in Chocolat, Casino Royale,  Black Panther and its sequel, and the films of Jim Jarmusch.

Early life and education
De Bankolé was born in Abidjan, Ivory Coast, to Yoruba parents from Benin. His grandparents are from Nigeria. He moved to Paris in 1975 for his last year of lycée, and pursued a master's degree in physics and mathematics. He then attended an aviation school and earned a private pilot licence, before a chance encounter with French director Gérard Vergez led him to enroll in the Cours Simon, a Parisian drama school.

Career
De Bankolé has appeared in over fifty films, including Jim Jarmusch's Night on Earth, Ghost Dog: The Way of the Samurai, Coffee and Cigarettes and The Limits of Control. He has been based in the United States since 1997. He appeared in the movie Machetero, in the role of journalist interviewing an imprisoned Puerto Rican revolutionary, along with the members of the New York City-based punk band Ricanstruction.

De Bankolé has also appeared in Lars von Trier's Manderlay. He portrayed Steven Obanno, a terrorist, in the 2006 James Bond film Casino Royale, and "The Lone Man", an assassin in Jim Jarmusch's film, The Limits of Control (2009). In 2013, he starred as Ayodele Balogun in Andrew Dosunmu's Mother of George, which premiered at the 2013 Sundance Film Festival and was the closing night selection for Maryland Film Festival 2013. He has also had roles in Calvary, The Last Witch Hunter, and Black Panther.

Personal life
De Bankolé is fluent in Yoruba, Bambara, English, French, German, and speaks some Italian. He was married to musician  Cassandra Wilson  from 2000 to 2003.

Filmography

Film

Television

Theatre

Awards
 1987 César Award for Most Promising Actor for his role in Black Mic Mac.

References

External links

1957 births
20th-century Ivorian male actors
21st-century Ivorian male actors
Ivorian emigrants to the United States
Ivorian expatriates in France
Ivorian male actors
Ivorian people of Nigerian descent
Ivorian people of Yoruba descent
Living people
Male actors in Yoruba cinema
Most Promising Actor César Award winners
People from Abidjan
University of Paris alumni